White Hot: The Rise & Fall of Abercrombie & Fitch is a 2022 American documentary film made for Netflix and directed by Alison Klayman. The film focuses on Abercrombie & Fitch's massive success and controversies during the late 1990s to 2000s. It was released on April 19, 2022.

Synopsis
White Hot: The Rise & Fall of Abercrombie & Fitch details the store's success and controversies, including its racist and exclusionary practices. The documentary focuses on the rise in popularity of the brand after the arrival of CEO Mike Jeffries in 1992, and his practices which led to a 2003 class-action suit which alleged racial discrimination in the stores’ hiring policies. Director Alison Klayman explores the company's toxic culture, featuring interviews from some of the original participants in the class action lawsuit. The documentary also features Samantha Elauf, who was rejected by Abercrombie for employment due to wearing a headscarf to the interview. Abercrombie fought back and the case ultimately went to the Supreme Court in 2015, which ruled in favor of Elauf.

Reception
On the review aggregator website Rotten Tomatoes, 63% of 27 critics' reviews are positive.

References

External links 
 
 

2022 films
2022 documentary films
English-language Netflix original films
Abercrombie & Fitch
Films about fashion in the United States
Netflix original documentary films
2020s English-language films